is a railway station on the Shinano Railway Kita-Shinano Line in the town of Shinano, Nagano, Japan, operated by the third-sector railway operator Shinano Railway.

Lines
Furama Station is served by the 37.3 km Kita-Shinano Line and is 25.1 kilometers from the starting point of the line at Nagano Station.

Station layout
The station has one ground-level side platform serving a single bi-directional track. The station is unattended.

Adjacent stations

History 
The station opened on 23 December 1928. With the privatization of Japanese National Railways (JNR) on 1 April 1987, the station came under the control of East Japan Railway Company (JR East).

From this date, Furuma Station was transferred to the ownership of the third-sector operating company Shinano Railway.

Passenger statistics
In fiscal 2013, while still under the control of JR East, the station was used by an average of 118 passengers daily (boarding passengers only).

Surrounding area
Furuma Post Office

See also
List of railway stations in Japan

References

External links

  

Railway stations in Japan opened in 1928
Railway stations in Nagano Prefecture
Kita-Shinano Line
Shinano, Nagano